The Chilean Formula Three Championship is an open-wheel racing series competition in Chile. 

The cars must have a chassis (monocoque or tubular steel frame) manufactured domestically, Nissan GA15S/GA15DS engine and a 4-speed transmission (reverse gear optional). The displacement of the carbureted engines may be increased up to 1600cc.

From 1972, The Chilean Formula Three Championship did not follow at any time, any of the FIA rules, for chassis or engine, and by the way, cannot be considered as a "Formula Three" championship.

Champions

Titles by driver

References

External links
Chilean Formula Three Championship official website

1972 establishments in Chile
Formula Three series
Motorsport in Chile